Winter Sports Complex is a multi-use indoor arena in Ashgabat, Turkmenistan. It is one of the largest ice hockey arenas in the CIS.

Overview
Construction of a new Ice Palace began in 2009. Turkmenistan President Gurbanguly Berdimuhamedov signed a contract worth 134.4 million euros with the Turkish company "Polimeks".

The arena is located at the corner of Atatürk and Oguzhan street. Holds 10,000 spectators. In the center are gyms, recreational areas for athletes and spectators, cafés and other facilities. The total area of the new sports facility is 107,000 square meters. In the center of the palace housed the ice arena measuring 60 by 30 meters. Construction was completed in October 2011.

The official opening took place on 19 October and was dedicated to the 20th anniversary of Independence of Turkmenistan. The opening ceremony was attended by Russian hockey team "Sputnik" (Almetyevsk), "Bars" (Kazan), "Podhale" (Nowy Targ, Poland) and "Maribor" (Slovenia): they took part in an international tournament dedicated to the Turkmenistan Independence Day.

Key features 
Date of construction: 2009 – October 2011
Area: 107 thousand square meters
Capacity: 10,000
Width and length: 60x30 meters
Hostel for 300 people

References

External links
Winter Sports Complex - Polimeks

2011 establishments in Turkmenistan
Ice hockey in Turkmenistan
Indoor ice hockey venues
Sports venues completed in 2011
Sports venues in Ashgabat